The Couronne was a 74-gun ship of the line of the French Navy.

She was built at Rochefort, being launched in 1749 and completed the following year. She served until being condemned at Brest and was broken up in 1766. Some of her timbers may have gone towards the construction of her namesake, the 80-gun Saint-Esprit-class Couronne, launched in August that year from Brest.

Ships of the line of the French Navy
1749 ships